Batman: The Dark Knight is an American comic book ongoing series and Limited series, and featuring Batman. One of two new ongoing titles to feature Bruce Wayne after the "Batman: The Return of Bruce Wayne" storyline, The Dark Knight depicts Bruce Wayne's life in Gotham City following his new global commitment to the newly established Batman Incorporated. In the writer David Finch's words, the stories are about relationships and connections he has in Gotham City that he can't walk away from.

Style and tone
Although the majority of his resources and time will go into his new global project, Batman, Inc., Finch describes his series as Bruce being unable to completely separate himself from his hometown and battleground for so many years. Finch states: "Even though Dick is here, it's not easy for Bruce to completely walk away. As much as Dick has proven himself, Bruce Wayne is still Bruce Wayne. It's very difficult for Bruce to just completely walk away from a fight he's been fighting his whole life. And then there's something in particular that keeps him interested as we kick off the series". Finch also addressed the nature of new, globally themed stories permeating most of the Batman line with Bruce Wayne, and how his title will stand out and largely apart from that trend: "Batman, in my book, is entirely in Gotham City. And yeah, this is the Batman we all know and love, and have for 70 years. Although Batman is spending time all over the world, he still has Gotham City as his home base, and he still has so many connections and ties and grudges and friendships in Gotham City".

Finch described his overall take on the character of Bruce Wayne: "Batman is a character that I know very well, and I had a strong sense of direction for him. I would be more reluctant to take on a character that I don't feel like I can relate to as well. He's very driven and black and white. I love that in a world of so much grey he can cut through it with so much clarity. Right or wrong, he never has to question. And there's something very engaging about a character that pushes his limits and never surrenders. There are so many variables and possibilities in a story, but you always know what Batman will do".

Plot

Volume One 
Launched alongside Batman Incorporated, the first volume of the series would last five issues. The plot was made to bridge the gap between Black Mass and Batman Incorporated. It would deal with Batman searching for his childhood friend, Dawn Golden who was involved with a conspiracy involving Killer Croc. Croc had ended up selling her to the Penguin, who was using her as a tool of revenge against his own personal humility and against Batman. Eventually Batman discovers her relations to Jason Blood and the demon Etrigan. In the end, Batman mourns the loss of Dawn who is fatally wounded.

Volume Two 
DC Comics relaunched Batman: The Dark Knight with issue #1 in September 2011, as part of The New 52. While David Finch was originally supposed to be the writer on the series permanently, Paul Jenkins was later announced to be co-writing issues. Joe Harris and Judd Winick had guest appearances before Gregg Hurwitz would take over the series.

Knight Terrors: As Bruce is unable to keep up with the various legal conspiracies involving Batman Incorporated, he decides to investigate a breakout in Arkham. There he finds criminals being fed a modified fear toxin that is mixed in with venom which makes the criminals extremely strong and immune to fear. He finds it being given to criminals by a new foe named the White Rabbit. When Batman approaches her she quickly defeats him and injects him with the fear toxin which she then gives to the Flash. Bruce then finds Bane to be behind the new fear toxin and combats him, Bruce manages to burn the fear toxin out of his and the Flash's body's by getting pushed to the limit. Bruce manages to defeat Bane, but is left confused by the White Rabbit.

Collected editions

References